James Walter Curry (May 11, 1856 – May 5, 1924) was an Ontario barrister and political figure. He represented Toronto Southeast in the Legislative Assembly of Ontario from 1919 to 1923 as a Liberal member.

He was born in Port Hope, Canada West, the son of James Curry. Curry practiced law in Port Hope, Millbrook and Toronto, where he became head of a law firm. He was also president of the Toronto Lacrosse Club. In 1884, he married Amy May Eyre. He served as Crown Attorney in Toronto from 1892 to 1906. He ran unsuccessfully for a seat in the provincial assembly in 1908. His son Walter was killed at Vimy Ridge . He died May 5, 1924.

References 

 Canadian Parliamentary Guide, 1920, EJ Chambers

External links 
Member's parliamentary history for the Legislative Assembly of Ontario
Biography, Trent University Archives

1856 births
1924 deaths
Ontario Liberal Party MPPs